James Cranfield, 2nd Earl of Middlesex (1621 – 16 September 1651),  styled Lord Cranfield from 1622 until 1645, was an English politician who sat in the House of Commons in 1640 and inherited his peerage in 1645.

Cranfield was the son of Lionel Cranfield, 1st Earl of Middlesex and was baptised on 27 December 1621.

In April 1640, Cranfield was elected Member of Parliament for Liverpool in the Short Parliament. He inherited the earldom on the death of his father in 1645. Middlesex was nominated as Lord Lieutenant of Staffordshire in 1646 and Keeper of Kingswood Forest in 1647. In 1648, he was a Parliamentary commissioner to the Treaty of Newport.

Cranfield married Lady Anne Bourchier, daughter of  Edward Bourchier, 4th Earl of Bath. His daughter Elizabeth married John Egerton, 3rd Earl of Bridgewater.  He was succeeded by his brother Lionel who became the 3rd Earl of Middlesex.

References

Cranfield, James Cranfield, Lord
1621 births
1651 deaths
Members of the Parliament of England (pre-1707) for Liverpool
Earls of Middlesex